The Coalition of Progressive Organizations (COP) was an electoral alliance formed in Formentera by the Socialist Party of the Balearic Islands, United Left of the Balearic Islands and The Greens to contest the 1999 and 2003 regional elections.

Composition

Political parties in the Balearic Islands
Defunct political party alliances in Spain
Political parties established in 2003
Political parties disestablished in 2007